The following pendulum is known as the Mackerras pendulum, invented by psephologist Malcolm Mackerras. Designed for the outcome of the 2010 Victorian state election, the pendulum works by lining up all of the seats held in Parliament, according to the percentage point margin on a two candidate preferred basis. The two party result is also known as the swing required for the seat to change hands. Given a uniform swing to the opposition or government parties in an election, the number of seats that change hands can be predicted. Swing is never uniform, but in practice variations of swings usually tend to cancel each other out. "Safe" seats require a swing of over 10 per cent to change, "fairly safe" seats require a swing of between 6 and 10 per cent, while "marginal" seats require a swing of less than 6 per cent.

See also
Pre-election pendulum for the 2014 Victorian state election

References

Pendulums for Victorian state elections